The Super-Skrull (Kl'rt) is a character appearing in American comic books published by Marvel Comics, generally as an enemy of the Fantastic Four, the powers of whom he possessed. The character, created by Stan Lee and Jack Kirby, first appeared in Fantastic Four #18 (September 1963), and has been depicted as both a supervillain and an antihero. The character has also appeared on television and in video games and novels.

Publication history

Super-Skrull first appeared in Fantastic Four #18 and was created by Stan Lee and Jack Kirby.

Fictional character biography
The Super-Skrull is from the Skrull world of Tarnax IV (in the Tarnax system of the Andromeda Galaxy), which has been destroyed by Galactus. He was a decorated soldier in the army and married a Skrull countess from the planet Zaragz'na and had two children, his beloved son named Sarnogg and a daughter named Jazinda, whom he despised. Because of his duty, he was kept away from his family and after the defeats outnumbered his victories, he was banished from Zaragz'na and was not allowed to see his son due to his wife.

Skrull emperor Dorrek VII devised a way to strike back against the Fantastic Four, who thwarted the Empire's invasion of Earth. Dorrek chose the warrior Kl'rt, who was given the combined abilities of the Fantastic Four. Kl'rt was stronger than the Thing; had superior flight and greater pyrokinetic ability than the Human Torch; had better control of invisibility and force fields than the Invisible Woman, and could stretch further than Mister Fantastic. The Super-Skrull retained his shapeshifting and hypnotic abilities, and was sent to Earth to defeat the Fantastic Four and pave the way for a new Skrull Empire invasion.

During their first encounter, the Super-Skrull keeps the Fantastic Four at bay and forces them to retreat. Mister Fantastic senses that Kl'rt's powers are augmented by an energy beam from the Skrull homeworld. Blocking the beam with a device placed on him by the Invisible Girl deprives Kl'rt of his new powers. Defeated, he is imprisoned in a crater by the Human Torch when he pursues the Invisible Girl.

The Super-Skrull returns as the Invincible Man after the Skrulls restored his powers to fight the Fantastic Four. He breaks out of his prison, travels to New York and kidnaps Johnny and Sue Storm's jailed father Franklin Storm. The Fantastic Four recognize his deception and return him in exchange for Storm. Storm dies when a bomb placed on him by the Skrull Warlord Morrat (in a final attempt to kill the Four) explodes, but he saves the Four. The Super-Skrull was among the villains summoned by Doctor Doom to attack Reed and Sue at their wedding, but Mister Fantastic used a machine to remove the villain's memories. Repeatedly sent back to Earth, he battles Thor, and Captain Marvel. The Super-Skrull is the Empire's agent on Earth during the Kree-Skrull War; he temporarily disbands the Avengers and kidnaps Mar-Vell, the Scarlet Witch and Quicksilver. With the war ending in a truce, the disgraced Super-Skrull sides with Thanos and (with Skragg) aids Thanos in his quest for the Cosmic Cube. The Super-Skrull, attempting to capture Rick Jones for Thanos, fights Mar-Vell and the Thing; Mar-Vell defeats him and Thanos. After a skirmish with Spider-Man, the Human Torch and Ms. Marvel, Kl'rt is trapped in the Van Allen radiation belt.

A Canadian research team accidentally pulls Kl'rt back from deep space. He kills the group except for the physicist superhero, Sasquatch. Kl'rt discovers that the radiation belt has given him cancer. Sasquatch is initially defeated by the Super-Skrull but tricks him, converting him into a stream of dissociated particles and sending him back into deep space. The Super-Skrull, later freed by the Silver Surfer, discovers that his cancer is in remission (apparently due to a "chronal anomaly" which reverted his cellular makeup to its precancerous state).

Kl'rt is freed from the Van Allen belt and cured of cancer by the sorcerer Master Khan, and used against hero Iron Fist. Khan brainwashes the Super-Skrull into believing that he is Bobby Wright, a twelve-year-old boy who acquires superhuman powers and a terminal disease from exposure to an alien spore. "Bobby" uses his powers to assume the identity of adult superhuman Captain Hero and ingratiate himself with Iron Fist and his crime-fighting partner, Power Man. Captain Hero's misuse of powers leaves Iron Fist apparently dead and triggers his disintegration.

The Super-Skrull's imprisonment shielded him from the effects of Zabyk's Disaster, when the Skrulls lost their shape-shifting ability. When the Empire falls into disarray, Kl'rt goes into hiding on Earth and later attacks the Fantastic Four.

He escapes his imprisonment and resumes contact with the Skrull Empire. The Super-Skrull seeks to take Young Avengers member Hulkling into protective custody because he has Skrullian heritage on his mother's side as the son of Princess Anelle. He impersonates the willing Hulkling (who wishes to remain on Earth) and returns to space able to spy on the Skrulls and the Kree, who also have a stake in Hulkling's mixed parentage since he is the son of Kree hero Mar-Vell.

During the Annihilation War, Kl'rt tries to stop the destructive wave before it reaches the Skrull world, where his son was. After he is nearly overwhelmed by the forces of Annihilus, he sacrifices himself by destroying the warship Harvester of Sorrow, however unable to save his son. Kl'rt meets Praxagora, a Negative Zone android who becomes his lover. His body is later recovered and revived. Kl'rt joins Ronan the Accuser and Zak-Del to reclaim the Kree home world from a Phalanx invasion. In defeating the Phalanx their leader, Ultron, causes Praxagora's death.

During the Skrulls' Secret Invasion of Earth, Super-Skrull aids Nova against the Skrulls.

After an unexplained capture, Kl'rt is seen as a prisoner on The Raft.

During the "Infinity" storyline, Super-Skrull is a member of the Galactic Council. To repay the Avengers' efforts in the war and attain glory, Kl'rt accompanies Alliance forces to Earth to free it from occupation by Thanos and they liberate the Peak. After his victory in the war against the Builders, Kl'rt is crowned emperor of a reborn Skrull Empire as the alien race is settled on the planet Tarnax II.

During the "Return to Planet Hulk" story arc, Super-Skrull arrived on the restored planet Sakaar. While Amadeus Cho's Hulk form was fighting the Warlord, Super-Skrull unearthed the Time Stone and plans to use it to restore the Skrull Empire to its former glory.

During the "Infinity Wars" storyline, Doctor Strange took the Time Stone from the Skrull sorcerer Mt'nox and used it to loop through time, creating multiple versions of himself to defeat Kl'rt.

During the "Empyre" storyline, Super-Skrull took part in the Kree/Skrull Alliance and was recruited by Tanalth the Pursuer to become part of Hulkling's inner circle. Though Hulkling did punch Super-Skrull for what he did to his mother. Super-Skrull states that the woman who raised him was Anelle's chambermaid and he has since regretted the action. At the persuasion of Tanalth the Pursuer, Super-Skrull talks about it stating that when a star builds up enough energy and detonates, the Pyre happens. Super-Skrull revealed that he had to use it on the Kral system where the Skrull colonies that imitated Earth's culture were wiped out during the Cotati's invasion much to the shock of Captain Marvel. Following the Cotati's defeat, Hulkling makes Super-Skrull pay for what he did to his foster mother by making him live with his actions and transferring him to diplomatic services effective immediately. In his first diplomatic mission, Super-Skrull and his subaltern Val-Korr go into peace talks with Noh-Varr of the Kree, Nova of the Nova Corps, Lani Ko Ako of the Badoon Sisterhood, Nymbus Sternhoff of the Kymellians, Emperor Stote of the Zn'rx who went to the restroom, Mentacle of the Rigellians, Oracle-2 of the Shi'ar, Zoralis Gupa from the planet Silnius, Empress Victoria of Spartax, and Peacekeeper of the Chitauri. The representatives go into peace talks while bringing up the Pyre incident and Hulkling's marriage to Wiccan. Nova proposes that all pan-world treaties remain in force and all forbidden weaponry to be decommissioned which Empress Victoria supports. When Emperor Stote is found dead and Marvel Boy is a suspect after attacking Val-Korr, Nova calls in the Guardians of the Galaxy to investigate Emperor Stote's murder. After reviewing what had happened up to Emperor Stote's murder, Super-Skrull states that a Snarkwar has begun in the Zn'rx race to decide his successor and declines Oracle-2's suggestion of a mind-probe. When asked by Rocket Raccoon to shoot Noh-Varr in the head with Val-Korr's gun, he does and part of Super-Skrull's head gets shot off and regenerates. Rocket Raccoon states that the gun is a gene-scanner which kill anyone who uses it on a Kree and suspects that one of the representatives was responsible. He has the Proscenium's computer system initiate the voice override code 877-Delta for one hour, instructs Oracle-2 and Mentacle to scan the minds, has Moondragon scan Oracle-2 and Mentacle's minds at the same time. The scan goes on until it reaches the mind of Peacekeeper as he initiates a bio-bomb on his chest while stating that he was to bring peace to the enemies who despise hive-kind. As Hercules and Phyla-Vell restrain Peacekeeper, Nova and Noh-Varr work to disarm the bio-bomb as Rocket Raccoon figures out that Lani Ko Ako is the true culprit since the Badoon Sisterhood have never left their planet nor sent anyone to represent them. Lani Ko Ako deactivates her image inducer revealing that she is the Profiteer who interfered in the peace meeting since it would put her out of work of selling weapons to feuding sides. After Zoralis Gupa takes an urgent call while mentioning to the person on the other side to warn all neighboring systems, he tells Victoria that it is the End of Everything as different planets are starting to die in the planets owned by the Shi'ar, the Kree/Skrull Alliance, and the Zn'rx while rendering the galactic economy fragile enough to go bankrupt. Knowing that she will not make a profit, the Profiteer teleports Peacekeeper and the bio-bomb away. While thanking Zoralis Gupa for fooling the Profiteer with the bluff, Zoralis Gupa states to Super-Skrull and everyone present that something darker than Galactus is destroying the worlds and its name is Knull.

Powers and abilities
Kl'rt can shapeshift (like all Skrulls) but, thanks to his bionic re-engineering by Skrull scientists, he has greater versions of the Fantastic Four's superpowers. Originally, these capabilities are being amplified from a special relaying satellite via Tarnax IV. Now, the prolonged exposure to its beams have made them permanent. The Super-Skrull possesses a unique ability: certain hypnotic skills. This allows him to control the minds of others or paralyze them by eye contact. He is an accomplished combatant, a competent starship pilot, talented impersonator, and highly trained in the martial applications of his powers.

Other Super-Skrulls
Kl'rt is not the only Super-Skrull serving the Skrull Empire. They are immune to detection by Wolverine's senses, Doctor Strange's magic, Spider-Man's spider-sense, Professor X's telepathy, and Iron Man's technology due to the effects of the Skrull infiltration ritual. They are not immune to Hood's magic at the time when they were derived from Dormammu. Known Super-Skrulls include:

 Biff Bison
 A Super-Skrull on Kral X who decorated his planet to resemble the setting of a TV show on Earth called "The Ritchie Redwood Show". He possesses the powers of Colossus, Cyclops, Dazzler, and Nightcrawler.

 Chrell
 A Skrull training instructor and commander. Like Kl'rt, Chrell possessed the powers of Mister Fantastic, Invisible Woman, Human Torch, and Thing.

 Criti Noll
 A Skrull with the powers of Hank Pym who was chosen to infiltrate Earth disguised as Hank. When Criti Nol tried to warn a diner owner, she was killed by a Skrull posing as Dum Dum Dugan. After Criti Noll's death, a clone replaced Hank Pym where the clone also had Black Panther's reflexes, Quicksilver's super-speed, and Vision's density and mass control. The clone captured Mister Fantastic and was later killed by Crusader in the final battle against Veranke.

 Godkiller
 A specially-bred female Super-Skrull with the powers of Battleaxe, Thundra, Titania and Volcana. Godkiller was genetically modified to use Beta Ray Bill's hammer Stormbreaker.

 Khn'nr
 A Skrull who posed as Captain Marvel with a copy of his Nega-Bands.

 Mr. Waspwind
 A Super-Skrull on Kral X who decorated his planet to resemble the setting of a TV show on Earth called "The Ritchie Redwood Show". He possesses the powers of Dazzler, Gambit, Iceman, Nightcrawler, and Wolverine.

 Pagon
 A Super-Skrull which replaced Elektra and Veranke's male lover Siri who died fighting Elektra. With Elektra's abilities, Pagon also had those of Colossus and Invisible Woman. He was killed by Echo in a suicide mission.

 Rl'nnd
 A Skrull with the powers of Colossus, Cyclops, Nightcrawler, and Wolverine.

 Siri
 A Skrull who was Veranke's lover. She tried to replace Elektra who killed her in battle. Siri had the powers of Elektra and Ghost Rider.

 Veranke
 A Skrull Queen and main villain of the Secret Invasion who posed as Spider-Woman and had a copy of her powers.

 Xavin
 A Super-Skrull in training with the powers of the Fantastic Four (but able to use only one at a time), and a member of the Runaways.

 X'iv
 A Skrull assassin with the abilities of Daredevil, Elektra and Cloak and Dagger who was sent by Chrell to assassinate Hulkling.

 Unnamed Super-Skrulls
 During the "Secret Invasion" storyline, several dozen Super-Skrull soldiers appear with powers, abilities, and equipment of numerous heroes and villains differing from soldier to soldier.

Other versions
In addition to his mainstream incarnation, Super-Skrull has appeared in other fictional universes:

Earth-6309
In this reality, Kl'rt is the Skrull lord of Colony UK7 and a Captain Britain Corps member.

Heroes Reborn
In the Heroes Reborn universe created by Franklin Richards, Super-Skrull masquerades as Wyatt Wingfoot, tricks Doctor Doom into capturing the Silver Surfer and steals the power of cosmic deity Galactus. When the Fantastic Four release the Surfer from Doom, he defeats Kl'rt.

Marvel Zombies
Super-Skrull appears in the Marvel Zombies series. He is infected by a zombified Spider-Man; Zombie Thing rips off his right arm, and he is apparently killed in battle. Another infected version appears in Marvel Zombies Return. He later fights Zombie Spider-Man and his New (Zombie) Avengers with other Avengers, and is killed by Iron Man (James Rhodes).When the Fantastic Four of Earth-616 (Black Panther, Storm, the Thing, and the Human Torch) visited the Marvel Zombies universe, they encountered four Skrulls who had been given the powers of the Fantastic Four in an attempt to replace the Super-Skrull. They are turned into zombies when the Galactus attacks, and the Fantastic Four take them apart before moving on to another dimension.

Professor W's X-Men
In this two-issue limited series, Super-Skrull has been killed by Rogue and his powers have been stolen. His abilities, superpowers and darker personality traits remain in Rogue as she joins Cyclops' Brotherhood of Evil Mutants. Professor W's X-Men appear in X-Men: Millennial Visions (2000) #2000 (Aug. 2000) and X-Men: Millennial Visions (2001) #2001 (Jan. 2002).

Squadron Supreme
The Skrullian Skymaster (real name Skymax), a member of the Squadron Supreme, has the same powers as the Super-Skrull.

Ultimate Marvel
In the Ultimate Marvel universe, Kl'rt is the Skrull emperor and oldest living Skrull. In an alternate timeline, created when the Ultimate Fantastic Four attempt to undo the accident that gave them their powers, their teleportation experiments allowed them to contact the apparently-benevolent Skrulls. This is part of the Skrulls' plan to use Earth's technology to further their plans for conquest. Although the Super-Skrull wears an anti-assassination suit that allows him to duplicate the powers of any superhuman in a thousand mile radius, he is defeated by the powerless Ben Grimm, the last human on Earth, only realizing when Ben points it out that he has no powers himself with no superpowers to duplicate. Having beaten Kl'rt in a straight fight, Ben takes his suit and travels back in time to the teleportation accident, allowing it to happen and sacrificing himself to save humanity.

Venomized
During the "Venomized" event, a "Poison Super-Skrull" is seen along with other Poisons, using the captured Symbiotes to invade Earth-616.

In other media

Television
 The Kl'rt incarnation of the Super-Skrull appeared in The Marvel Super Heroes, voiced by Tom Harvey.
 The Kl'rt incarnation of the Super-Skrull appeared in the Fantastic Four (1967) episode "Invasion of the Super-Skrull", voiced by Marvin Miller.
 The Kl'rt incarnation of the Super-Skrull appears in Fantastic Four (1994), initially voiced by Neil Ross and later by Jess Harnell.
 The Kl'rt incarnation of the Super-Skrull appears in the Fantastic Four: World's Greatest Heroes, voiced by Mark Oliver.
 The Kl'rt incarnation of the Super-Skrull appears in The Super Hero Squad Show, voiced by Charlie Adler in season one and Jim Cummings in season two.
 Kl'rt, Rl'nnd, a variation of Criti Noll who possesses Giant Man, Crimson Dynamo, Iron Man, and Klaw's powers, and a battalion of unnamed Super-Skrulls appear in The Avengers: Earth's Mightiest Heroes, with Kl'rt voiced by Kyle Hebert while Rl'nnd, Criti Noll, and the battalion have no dialogue.
 The Kl'rt incarnation of the Super-Skrull appears in the Hulk and the Agents of S.M.A.S.H., voiced by Kevin Grevioux.

Video games
 The Kl'rt incarnation of the Super-Skrull appears in Fantastic Four.
 The Kl'rt incarnation of the Super-Skrull appears as a mini-boss in Marvel: Ultimate Alliance, voiced by Greg Eagles.
 The Kl'rt incarnation of the Super-Skrull appears as a boss in Fantastic Four: Rise of the Silver Surfer, voiced by Joey Camen.
 The Kl'rt incarnation of the Super-Skrull appears as a playable character in Marvel vs. Capcom 3: Fate of Two Worlds and Ultimate Marvel vs. Capcom 3, voiced again by Charlie Adler. In the former, he is a member of the Cabal.
 The Kl'rt incarnation of the Super-Skrull appears in Marvel Super Hero Squad: The Infinity Gauntlet, voiced again by Jim Cummings.
 The Kl'rt incarnation of the Super-Skrull appears in Marvel Super Hero Squad Online.
 The Kl'rt incarnation of the Super-Skrull appears as a playable character in Marvel Avengers: Battle for Earth, voiced by Troy Baker.
 The Kl'rt incarnation of the Super-Skrull appears in Lego Marvel Super Heroes, voiced by John DiMaggio.
 The Kl'rt incarnation of the Super-Skrull appears in Marvel Heroes, voiced again by Charlie Adler. This version is a general.

Miscellaneous
 Kl'rt / Super-Skrull appears in the Ultimate Super-Villains: New Stories Featuring Marvel's Deadliest Villains line of novels by Stan Lee.
 Kl'rt / Super-Skrull appears in the X-Men / Avengers novel trilogy Gamma Quest. He aligns himself with the Leader to enhance his powers and successfully mimics those of Cyclops, Storm, Iceman, Beast, Captain America, Wolverine, Rogue, the Scarlet Witch, and the Hulk before Rogue uses the Leader's intellect to undo the procedure.

Merchandise
Super-Skrull is a playable character in the Marvel HeroClix Clobbern Time, Supernova and Galactic Guardians sets.

Super-Skrull is a "Build-A-Figure" in a 2019-2020 Marvel Legends action figure assortment that features figures from the Fantastic Four.

References

External links
 Super-Skrull at Marvel.com

Characters created by Jack Kirby
Characters created by Stan Lee
Comics characters introduced in 1963
Fantastic Four characters
Fictional characters who can stretch themselves
Fictional characters who can turn invisible
Fictional characters with fire or heat abilities
Fictional characters with slowed ageing
Fictional characters with superhuman durability or invulnerability
Fictional hypnotists and indoctrinators
Fictional impostors
Galactic emperors
Marvel Comics characters who have mental powers
Marvel Comics characters with superhuman strength
Marvel Comics extraterrestrial supervillains
Marvel Comics male supervillains
Marvel Comics military personnel
Marvel Comics mutates
Marvel Comics supervillains
Skrull